Mikhail Rasumny (May 13, 1884, in Odessa, Russian empire – February 17, 1956, in United States) was a Soviet and American film actor.

Biography
Rasumny was born in Odessa, son of the famous cantor Ephraim Zalman (Solomon) Razumny, who was chief cantor of the choral synagogues in Kishinev, Nikolayev and Odessa. After his father's death in 1905, he moved to Saint Petersburg, where he began his theatrical career. He later moved to Moscow and emigrated to Berlin in 1927. In 1933, he opened in Paris a Yiddish revue theater "Der kundes" and in 1934 another Yiddish company. "Parizer Azazel". In 1938 in New York, he opened the Yidishe dramatishe studie (Yiddish Dramatic Studio).

Rasumny married late in life, to Maria Schunzel, in 1947. He was survived by his wife when he died in 1956, and was buried at Beth Olam Cemetery in Los Angeles.

Filmography

References

External links

 
 

Russian male actors
Actors from Odesa
Jewish American male actors
Yiddish theatre performers
Soviet emigrants to the United States
1890 births
1956 deaths
Odesa Jews
20th-century American Jews